Dunellen is a borough in Middlesex County, in the U.S. state of New Jersey. It is located within the Raritan Valley region. As of the 2020 United States census, the borough's population was 7,637, an increase of 410 (+5.7%) from the 2010 census count of 7,227, which in turn reflected an increase of 404 (+5.9%) from the 6,823 counted in the 2000 census.

Dunellen was formed as a borough by an act of the New Jersey Legislature on October 28, 1887, when it broke away from Piscataway Township, based on the results of a referendum held on March 23, 1886. Dunellen's incorporation was confirmed on April 15, 1914. The borough was named for the Dunellen station of the Central Railroad of New Jersey.

History
The earliest inhabitants of the area that would become Dunellen were the Lenape Native Americans; several Lenape sites in Dunellen were identified as part of a comprehensive survey in 1915. European settlers were drawn to the area as early as 1682, attracted by the productive agricultural land.

Railroad access from New York City to present-day Dunellen began in 1840. Dunellen grew from its start in 1867 with the construction of a railroad station, which was originally called New Market station, serving the nearby community of the same name in Piscataway. When it was originally constructed, the tracks were at grade level with North Avenue and the railroad was the Elizabethtown and Somerville Railroad, which later became part of the Central Railroad of New Jersey. The Central Railroad of New Jersey, created the residential development in the area which it owned surrounding its train station. The railroad brought industry to the area.

The Art Color factory built in 1925 was Dunellen's principal industry and produced as many as 10 million magazines a month. The W. F. Hall Printing Company of Chicago bought Art Color in 1931, and ran it until 1968, when it closed the plant there.

Geography
According to the United States Census Bureau, the borough had a total area of 1.06 square miles (2.75 km2), all of which was land. Dunellen is in the Raritan Valley, a line of communities in central New Jersey. Dunellen is in the central division along with Bound Brook, South Bound Brook and Middlesex.

The borough borders Middlesex and Piscataway Township in Middlesex County; Green Brook Township in Somerset County; and Plainfield in Union County.

Demographics

2010 census

The Census Bureau's 2006–2010 American Community Survey showed that (in 2010 inflation-adjusted dollars) median household income was $74,375 (with a margin of error of +/− $13,504) and the median family income was $88,527 (+/− $13,868). Males had a median income of $48,542 (+/− $13,495) versus $43,920 (+/− $12,613) for females. The per capita income for the borough was $30,960 (+/− $3,015). About 5.6% of families and 8.3% of the population were below the poverty line, including 7.8% of those under age 18 and 9.5% of those age 65 or over.

2000 census
As of the 2000 United States census there were 6,823 people, 2,451 households, and 1,710 families residing in the borough. The population density was 6,573.9 people per square mile (2,533.1/km2). There were 2,520 housing units at an average density of 2,428.0 per square mile (935.6/km2). The racial makeup of the borough was 84.07% White, 3.66% African American, 0.25% Native American, 3.56% Asian, 0.01% Pacific Islander, 6.38% from other races, and 2.07% from two or more races. Hispanic or Latino of any race were 14.80% of the population.

There were 2,451 households, out of which 33.9% had children under the age of 18 living with them, 54.4% were married couples living together, 10.7% had a female householder with no husband present, and 30.2% were non-families. 23.5% of all households were made up of individuals, and 8.2% had someone living alone who was 65 years of age or older. The average household size was 2.75 and the average family size was 3.30.

In the borough the population was spread out, with 24.9% under the age of 18, 6.9% from 18 to 24, 36.0% from 25 to 44, 20.9% from 45 to 64, and 11.3% who were 65 years of age or older. The median age was 36 years. For every 100 females, there were 101.0 males. For every 100 females age 18 and over, there were 99.2 males.

The median income for a household in the borough was $59,205, and the median income for a family was $67,188. Males had a median income of $45,000 versus $34,130 for females. The per capita income for the borough was $26,529. About 1.4% of families and 3.3% of the population were below the poverty line, including 2.0% of those under age 18 and 4.2% of those age 65 or over.

Government

Local government
Dunellen is governed under the Borough form of New Jersey municipal government, which is used in 218 municipalities (of the 564) statewide, making it the most common form of government in New Jersey. The governing body is comprised of the Mayor and the Borough Council, with all positions elected at-large on a partisan basis as part of the November general election. A Mayor is elected directly by the voters to a four-year term of office. The Borough Council is comprised of six members elected to serve three-year terms on a staggered basis, with two seats coming up for election each year in a three-year cycle. The Borough form of government used by Dunellen is a "weak mayor / strong council" government in which council members act as the legislative body with the mayor presiding at meetings and voting only in the event of a tie. The mayor can veto ordinances subject to an override by a two-thirds majority vote of the council. The mayor makes committee and liaison assignments for council members, and most appointments are made by the mayor with the advice and consent of the council.

, the Mayor of Dunellen is Republican Jason F. Cilento, whose term of office ends December 31, 2023. Members of the Borough Council (with party and term-end year in parentheses) are Council President Trina Rios (R, 2022), Teresa Albertson (R, 2024), Jessica Dunne (D, 2023), Joseph Paltjon (R, 2024), Daniel Cole Sigmon (R, 2022) and Harold VanDermark (D, 2023; appointed to serve an unexpired term).

In October 2021, the Borough Council selected Harold VanDermark from a list of three candidates nominated by the Democratic municipal committee to fill the seat expiring in December 2023 that had been held by Tremayne Reid until he resigned earlier that month. VanDermark will serve on an interim basis until the November 2021 general election, when voters will choose a candidate to serve the balance of the term of office.

Federal, state and county representation
Dunellen is located in the 12th Congressional District and is part of New Jersey's 22nd state legislative district.

 

Middlesex County is governed by a Board of County Commissioners, whose seven members are elected at-large on a partisan basis to serve three-year terms of office on a staggered basis, with either two or three seats coming up for election each year as part of the November general election. At an annual reorganization meeting held in January, the board selects from among its members a commissioner director and deputy director. , Middlesex County's Commissioners (with party affiliation, term-end year, and residence listed in parentheses) are 
Commissioner Director Ronald G. Rios (D, Carteret, term as commissioner ends December 31, 2024; term as commissioner director ends 2022),
Commissioner Deputy Director Shanti Narra (D, North Brunswick, term as commissioner ends 2024; term as deputy director ends 2022),
Claribel A. "Clary" Azcona-Barber (D, New Brunswick, 2022),
Charles Kenny (D, Woodbridge Township, 2022),
Leslie Koppel (D, Monroe Township, 2023),
Chanelle Scott McCullum (D, Piscataway, 2024) and 
Charles E. Tomaro (D, Edison, 2023).
Constitutional officers are
County Clerk Nancy Pinkin (D, 2025, East Brunswick),
Sheriff Mildred S. Scott (D, 2022, Piscataway) and 
Surrogate Claribel Cortes (D, 2026; North Brunswick).

Politics
As of March 2011, there were a total of 3,775 registered voters in Dunellen, of which 1,063 (28.2%) were registered as Democrats, 726 (19.2%) were registered as Republicans and 1,983 (52.5%) were registered as Unaffiliated. There were 3 voters registered as Libertarians or Greens.

In the 2012 presidential election, Democrat Barack Obama received 56.1% of the vote (1,387 cast), ahead of Republican Mitt Romney with 42.3% (1,047 votes), and other candidates with 1.6% (39 votes), among the 2,488 ballots cast by the borough's 3,842 registered voters (15 ballots were spoiled), for a turnout of 64.8%. In the 2008 presidential election, Democrat Barack Obama received 52.9% of the vote (1,478 cast), ahead of Republican John McCain with 44.5% (1,244 votes) and other candidates with 1.8% (50 votes), among the 2,794 ballots cast by the borough's 3,883 registered voters, for a turnout of 72.0%. In the 2004 presidential election, Republican George W. Bush received 50.0% of the vote (1,260 ballots cast), outpolling Democrat John Kerry with 48.0% (1,211 votes) and other candidates with 1.2% (44 votes), among the 2,521 ballots cast by the borough's 3,666 registered voters, for a turnout percentage of 68.8.

In the 2013 gubernatorial election, Republican Chris Christie received 64.7% of the vote (982 cast), ahead of Democrat Barbara Buono with 33.2% (503 votes), and other candidates with 2.1% (32 votes), among the 1,540 ballots cast by the borough's 3,894 registered voters (23 ballots were spoiled), for a turnout of 39.5%. In the 2009 gubernatorial election, Republican Chris Christie received 54.6% of the vote (944 ballots cast), ahead of Democrat Jon Corzine with 34.1% (589 votes), Independent Chris Daggett with 8.9% (153 votes) and other candidates with 1.9% (33 votes), among the 1,728 ballots cast by the borough's 3,744 registered voters, yielding a 46.2% turnout.

Education
The Dunellen Public Schools serve students in pre-kindergarten through twelfth grade. As of the 2020–21 school year, the district, comprised of three schools, had an enrollment of 1,238 students and 112.0 classroom teachers (on an FTE basis), for a student–teacher ratio of 11.1:1. Schools in the district (with 2020–21 enrollment data from the National Center for Education Statistics) are 
John P. Faber School with 591 students in grades PreK-5, 
Lincoln Middle School with 246 students in grades 6-8 and 
Dunellen High School with 372 students in grades 9-12.

Eighth grade students from all of Middlesex County are eligible to apply to attend the high school programs offered by the Middlesex County Vocational and Technical Schools, a county-wide vocational school district that offers full-time career and technical education at Middlesex County Academy in Edison, the Academy for Allied Health and Biomedical Sciences in Woodbridge Township and at its East Brunswick, Perth Amboy and Piscataway technical high schools, with no tuition charged to students for attendance.

Transportation

Roads and highways

No Interstate or U.S. highways serve Dunellen directly. The most prominent roads passing through the borough include New Jersey Route 28 and County Route 529.

Public transportation
The Dunellen station offers NJ Transit service on the Raritan Valley Line. There is a ticket office open only during morning rush hour and a small waiting area at this stop.  There are now automated ticket machines located next to the office. A simple station, there are two tracks with two small side platforms. The station is located on a high embankment.

NJ Transit bus service is provided on the 113 and 114 routes to the Port Authority Bus Terminal in Midtown Manhattan, with local service on the 59, 65 and 66 routes.

Suburban Transit offers service between Dunellen and Atlantic City on its 700 route.

Organizations
 Juggling Life is a non-profit organization whose purpose is to inspire and emotionally heal ill and/or disadvantaged children through juggling and the arts.

Notable people

People who were born in, residents of, or otherwise closely associated with Dunellen include:

 Tom Brislin (born 1973), keyboardist/songwriter/vocalist for the band Kansas since 2018
 Bob Fitzsimmons (1863–1917), a boxer who was the sport's first three-division world champion
 Bob Maier (1915–1993), third baseman who played for the Detroit Tigers team that won the 1945 World Series in his only season in the Major Leagues
 Sydney McLaughlin (born 1999), hurdler and sprinter who won the Gold Medal in the 400-meter hurdles at the 2020 Summer Olympics
 Judith Persichilli (born 1949), nurse and health care executive who has served as the Commissioner of the New Jersey Department of Health
 William Marsh Rice (1816–1900), businessman who bequeathed his fortune to found Rice University
 Tom Scharpling (born 1969), author, screenwriter, broadcaster, and media executive; creator and host of The Best Show
 Walter Stone (1920–1999), writer for The Honeymooners and  The Jackie Gleason Show
 Frank Umont (1917–1991), Major League Baseball umpire

Twin towns — Sister cities
Dunellen is twinned with:
 Borgonovo Val Tidone, Italy
 Castel San Giovanni, Italy

References

External links

 Official Dunellen Borough website
 Dunellen Police Department website
 Dunellen Fire Department website
 Dunellen Rescue Squad website
 Dunellen Public Schools
 
 School Data for the Dunellen Public Schools, National Center for Education Statistics
 Dunellen Historical Society

 
1887 establishments in New Jersey
Borough form of New Jersey government
Boroughs in Middlesex County, New Jersey
Populated places established in 1887